The 1944 New York Yankees season was the team's 42nd season in New York. The team finished in third place in the American League with a record of 83–71, finishing 6 games behind the St. Louis Browns. New York was managed by Joe McCarthy. The Yankees played their home games at Yankee Stadium.

Offseason 
 Prior to the 1944 season: Jim Greengrass was signed as an amateur free agent by the Yankees.

Spring training 
The Yankees trained in 1944 at Bader Field in Atlantic City, New Jersey. The team made the 300-room Senator Hotel their headquarters and practiced indoors at the Atlantic City Armory.

They played their first exhibition game in Atlantic City on April 1, 1944, and beat the Philadelphia Phillies 5–1, behind a home run by Johnny Lindell. The following day, 4,000 fans saw the Yankees beat the Brooklyn Dodgers, 4–3.

Regular season

Season standings

Record vs. opponents

Roster

Player stats

Batting

Starters by position 
Note: Pos = Position; G = Games played; AB = At bats; R = Runs; H = Hits; Avg. = Batting average; HR = Home runs; RBI = Runs batted in; SB = Stolen bases

Other batters 
Note: G = Games played; AB = At bats; R = Runs; H = Hits; Avg. = Batting average; HR = Home runs; RBI = Runs batted in; SB = Stolen bases

Pitching

Starting pitchers 
Note: G = Games pitched; IP = Innings pitched; W = Wins; L = Losses; ERA = Earned run average; SO = Strikeouts

Other pitchers 
Note: G = Games pitched; IP = Innings pitched; W = Wins; L = Losses; ERA = Earned run average; SO = Strikeouts

Relief pitchers 
Note: G = Games pitched; W = Wins; L = Losses; SV = Saves; ERA = Earned run average; SO = Strikeouts

Farm system 

LEAGUE CHAMPIONS: Binghamton

References

External links
1944 New York Yankees at Baseball Reference
1944 New York Yankees team page at www.baseball-almanac.com

New York Yankees seasons
New York Yankees
New York Yankees
1940s in the Bronx